Harry Van Gorkum is a British actor living in the United States. Born in London, he studied at Lancaster University before becoming a stage actor. He later moved to the United States, where he has appeared in more than eighty films since 1989.

Filmography

References 
 2. https://theedenmagazine.com/magazine/january-2019/

External links 

Date of birth unknown
Living people
Male actors from London
Alumni of Lancaster University
British male stage actors
British male film actors
British male television actors
British expatriate male actors in the United States
20th-century British male actors
21st-century British male actors
Year of birth missing (living people)